Koprivnica-Križevci County is a county in Northern Croatia. Its hyphenated name comes from two entities: the two of its largest cities, Koprivnica and Križevci; Koprivnica is the official capital of the county.

The county also includes a third town, Đurđevac, but its population is much smaller than the main two (8,862 in 2001).

The Koprivnica-Križevci County borders on the Međimurje County in the north, Varaždin County in the northwest, Zagreb County in the southwest, Bjelovar-Bilogora County in the south, Virovitica-Podravina County in the southeast and Hungary in the east.

History
Koprivnica was first mentioned in 1272 in a document by prince Ladislaus IV of Hungary and was declared a free royal town by king Ludovic I in 1356.  It has flourished as a trading place and a military fortress since that time.

The military aspect set it back when it was included in the Croatian Military Frontier in the 16th century during the wars with the Ottoman Turks. After Maria Theresa's decree of 1765, however, it resumed life as a peaceful little merchant town.

Koprivnica developed significantly in the 20th century with the advent of the Podravka food industry, and is known worldwide for its Vegeta spice.

Križevci, on the other hand, as a smaller city and second mentioned in the county name, may seem like an underdog to its neighbour Koprivnica. Its first mention was from 1193 by Béla III but it was divided into two parts which developed at different rates.

After centuries of division, empress Maria Theresa united the Lower and Upper Križevac into Križevci in 1752. The town was also hit by the wars with the Turks, but it regained importance in 1871 when the railway was built through it on the way from Budapest to Rijeka.

Modern Križevci is oriented towards entrepreneurship, while preserving its eight beautiful churches (one of which is a cathedral), built mostly in the Middle Ages.

Administrative division
Koprivnica-Križevci county is divided into:

 City of Koprivnica (county seat)
 Town of Križevci
 Town of Đurđevac
 Municipality of Drnje
 Municipality of Đelekovec
 Municipality of Ferdinandovac
 Municipality of Gola
 Municipality of Gornja Rijeka
 Municipality of Hlebine
 Municipality of Kalinovac
 Municipality of Kalnik
 Municipality of Kloštar Podravski
 Municipality of Koprivnički Bregi
 Municipality of Koprivnički Ivanec
 Municipality of Legrad
 Municipality of Molve
 Municipality of Novigrad Podravski
 Municipality of Novo Virje
 Municipality of Peteranec
 Municipality of Podravske Sesvete
 Municipality of Rasinja
 Municipality of Sokolovac
 Municipality of Sveti Ivan Žabno
 Municipality of Sveti Petar Orehovec
 Municipality of Virje

Demographics 

As of the 2011 census, the county had 115,584 residents. The population density is 71 people per km².

References

External links

 

 
Counties of Croatia